Geotomus punctulatus, also known as the Cornish shieldbug, is a species of burrowing bug in the family Cydnidae, found in Asia and Europe.

Description
A small black shieldbug, 3.5 mm to 4.5 mm in length, with sparse, long hairs around the head, forewings and pronotum. The corium and rear margin of the pronotum often has reddish markings. It feeds on lady's bedstraw (Galium verum) in sparsely vegetated areas of loose sand in sand dunes.

Distribution and status
The species is widely distributed in the southern Palaearctic from Great Britain to Japan. In Great Britain it has been found near Sennen Cove, on the towans at Whitesand Bay, Cornwall for over one hundred years and two specimens were taken from Cowbridge, Vale of Glamorgan in the 19th-century. The Cornish population is not known but probably numbers in the hundreds rather than thousands. In 1962 it was present ″in considerable numbers″ and on 31 May 1882 it was numerous. This location is above a popular beach so is under threat from excessive public pressure.

References

Cydnidae
Hemiptera of Asia
Hemiptera of Europe
Insects described in 1847
Penwith
Taxa named by Achille Costa